Viper Comics is an American comics publisher that first published works in 2003.

History 
Viper Comics is based in Texas, USA; according to its website it is based in Irving, an inner ring suburb of Dallas. Its president since its foundation is Jessie Garza. The company was established in 2001, though its first comics were printed in 2003, launching with Dead@17 and Moon Rush. Dead@17 was a "sleeper hit" for the company and received positive reviews.

Viper Comic books have been distributed by Diamond Comic Distributors and their graphic novels are distributed through Diamond, Ingram Books, Baker & Taylor, Inc., and other distributors.

Works published 

The following is a list of titles published by Viper Comics:

 Attack of the Killer Tomatoes
 A Bit Haywire
 Battle Smash Vs. The Saucermen From Venus
 Blue Agave & Worm
 Daisy Kutter
 Dead@17 – one of Viper Comics' first two titles, but later moved to Image Comics.
 Dummy's Guide to Danger
 Emily Edison – recommended by The Young Adult Library Services Association (YALS) in 2007 as one of its Great Graphic Novels for Teens
 "The Expendable One"
 Hell House: The Awakening
 Inspector Gadget
 Johnny Test
 Karma Incorporated
 Kid Houdini and the Silver Dollar Misfits
 The Lost Books of Eve
 The Middleman – recommended by The Young Adult Library Services Association (YALS) in 2007 as one of its Great Graphic Novels for Teens
 Missing Linx
 Moon Rush – one of Viper Comics' first two titles
 Nosferatu
 Oddly Normal – first published with Viper Comics but later moved to Image Comics
 Random Encounter
 Sasquatch (Sasquatch Comic Anthology)
 Stu Bear in the 25th Century
 Villains
 Vendor

External links

References 

 
Companies based in Dallas
Book publishing companies based in Texas
Publishing companies established in 2001
Comic book publishing companies of the United States